Freydun (from the Avestan Θraētaona), is an Iranian masculine given name. Common variations include the names Freidun, Feridun, Faridun, Faredoon, Fereydoon, Ferydoon, and  Fereydun.

Etymology
All of the forms of the name shown above derive, by regular sound laws, from Proto-Iranian Thraetaona (Θraētaona) and Proto-Indo-Iranian Traitaunas.

Traitaunas is a derivative (with augmentative suffix -una/-auna) of Tritas, the name of a deity or hero reflected in the Vedic Trita and the Avestan Thrita (Θrita). Both names are identical to the adjective meaning "the third", a term used of a minor deity associated with two other deities to form a triad. In the Indian Vedas, Trita is associated with gods of thunder and wind.

Trita is also called Aptya (Āptya), a name that is probably cognate with Athwiya (Āθβiya), the name of father of Thraetaona in the Avestā. Traitaunas may therefore be interpreted as "the great son of the deity Tritas". The name was borrowed from Parthian into Armenian as Hrudēn.

Notable People
Freydun or Freidun may refer to: 
Freidun Aghalyan (1876-1994), Armenian architect
Freydun Atturaya (1891–1926), Assyrian physician

Feridun may refer to:
Feridun Ahmed Bey (died 1583), Ottoman official, bureaucrat, author and military officer
Feridun Aybars (born 1952), Turkish former swimmer
Feridun Bilgin (born 1964), Turkish civil servant and politician, former Minister of Transport, Maritime and Communication
Feridun Buğeker (1933-2014), Turkish football player
Feridun Düzağaç (born 1968), Turkish singer
Feridun Hamdullahpur, Turkish-Canadian academic
Feridun Karakaya (1922-2004), Turkish comedy actor
Feridun Sinirlioğlu (born 1956), Turkish diplomat and civil servant 
Feridun Sungur (born 1984), Turkish football player
Feridun Zaimoğlu (born 1964), German author and visual artist of Turkish origin

Faridun or Faredoon may refer to:
Faridun Muhiddinov, Tajikistani engineer and politician
Faredoon Irani, Indian cinematographer

Fereydoon or Ferydoon may refer to:
Fereydoon Batmanghelidj (1931–2004), Iranian medical doctor
Fereydoon Davatchi, director of the Rheumatology Research Center (RRC) in the Tehran University of Medical sciences
Fereydoon Hoveyda (1924–2006), influential Iranian diplomat, writer and thinker
Fereydoon Farrokhzad (1936–1992), Persian singer, actor, poet, TV and Radio host, writer, and political opposition figure
Fereydoon Fazli (born 1971), Iranian football player
Fereydoon Foroughi (1951-2001), Iranian singer
Fereydoon Mirza (1810–1855), the 5th son of Abbas Mirza, then crown prince of Persia
Fereydoon Moshiri (1926–2000), contemporary Persian poet
Fereydoon Motamed (1917–1993), professor and linguist
Ferydoon Zandi (born 1979), Iranian football midfielder

Fereydun may refer to:
Fereydun, an Iranian mythical king and hero
Fereydun Adamiyat (1920–2008), Iranian historian
Fereydun Robert "Fred" Armisen, (born 1966), American comedian and actor
Fereydun Gole (1942–2005), Iranian screenwriter
Fereydun Khan Cherkes (died 1620/21), Safavid official and military commander

Other uses:
Fereydoon Family (born 1945), leading Persian physicists in the field of nanotechnology and solid-state physics
Hassan Fereydun (born 1948), birth name of Hassan Rouhani, the 7th President of Iran

See also
Freydun (disambiguation)